The Bootlegger's Daughter is a 1922 American silent drama film directed by Victor Schertzinger and starring Enid Bennett, Fred Niblo, and Donald MacDonald.

Cast
 Enid Bennett as Nell Bradley 
 Fred Niblo as Reverend Charles Alden 
 Donald MacDonald as Charles Fuhr 
 Melbourne MacDowell as Jim Bradley 
 Virginia Southern as Amy Robinson 
 William Elmer as Ben Roach 
 J.P. Lockney as Phil Glass 
 Caroline Rankin as Matilda Boggs 
 Otto Hoffman as The Deacon 
 Harold Goodwin as Violinist

References

Bibliography
 James Robert Parish & Michael R. Pitts. Film directors: a guide to their American films. Scarecrow Press, 1974.

External links
 

1922 films
1922 drama films
1920s English-language films
American silent feature films
Silent American drama films
Films directed by Victor Schertzinger
American black-and-white films
Associated Exhibitors films
1920s American films